Kuźnica (formerly Kuźnica Białostocka) is a village in Sokółka County, Podlaskie Voivodeship, in north-eastern Poland, close to the border with Belarus. It is the seat of the gmina (administrative district) called Gmina Kuźnica.

In 2019, the village had a population of 1,717.

Transport 
The village stands at the northeastern end of the Expressway S19. A major border crossing into Belarus is located near the village. The new checkpoint was funded by the European Union to be upgraded to EU standards as this became a Schengen external border entry point when Poland became part of the Schengen Area on 21 December 2007. The Belarus side of the crossing is called Bruzgi.

A station on the Rail Line 6 is situated to the north of the village. There is a passenger service to Białystok, but not anymore to Belarus (Bruzgi), although cross-border rail tracks exist. Both highway and railway going into Belarus connect Kuźnica with Grodno 25 km away.

References

Villages in Sokółka County
Trakai Voivodeship
Sokolsky Uyezd
Białystok Voivodeship (1919–1939)
Belastok Region
Belarus–Poland border crossings